Thalassoma amblycephalum, the blunt-headed wrasse, blue-headed wrasse, blue-headed zoe, moon wrasse, paddle-fin wrasse or two-tone wrasse, is a species of wrasse native to the Indian Ocean and the western Pacific Ocean. This species can reach  in standard length. It can also be found in the aquarium trade.

References

External links
 

amblycephalum
Taxa named by Pieter Bleeker
Fish described in 1856